Koets means coach (a four-wheeled carriage) in Dutch. It is a Dutch surname that may refer to

Adam Koets (born 1984), American football offensive tackle
Arent Jacobsz Koets (c.1600–1635), Dutch concierge
Arne Koets, Dutch historical European martial arts practitioner
Roelof Koets (1592–1654), Dutch painter
Roelof Koets (Zwolle) (1655–1725), Dutch painter

See also
Kuts 
Kutz
Couts

Dutch-language surnames